Bruggennea is a genus of air-breathing land snails, terrestrial pulmonate gastropod mollusks in the family Streptaxidae.

The generic name Bruggennea is in honor of Dutch malacologist Adolph Cornelis van Bruggen.

Distribution 
The distribution of the genus Bruggennea includes:
 Kalimantan, Indonesia

Species
Species within the genus Bruggennea include:
 Bruggennea luminifera 
 Bruggennea bongi 
 Bruggennea laidlawi

References

Streptaxidae